The Goulet de Brest is a 3-km-long strait linking the roadstead of Brest to the Atlantic Ocean.

At each turn of the tide, the ocean refills the roadstead in a current that can attain 4 to 5 knots.

Military significance 

It is the only opening into the roadstead of Brest, and thus the only access to the town. The geography of the  favours the defenders, as it has a spine down its length, in the form of the Le Mengant rocks, which force ships to sail either to their north or south.

The body of water is surrounded by these areas and sites (nearby or at a moderate distance):

 Area around Brest North shore
 Fort de Bertheaume
 Fort de Toulbroc'h
 Fort du Petit Minou
 Fort du Mengant (Fort du Léon)
 Fort du Dellec
 Fort de Portzic

 Area around Roscanvel South shore peninsula
 Fort of the îlot des Capucins
 Fort de la Fraternité
 îlot du Diable
 Fortified lines of Quélern
 Batteries of Kerviniou
 Batteries of Tremet
 Fort on pointe des Espagnols
 Powder-stores of the Île des Morts
 Battery of Cornouaille

 Batteries of Kerbonn
 Batteries of Le Toulinguet
 Batteries of Pointe du Petit Gouin and Pointe du Grand Gouin
 Tour Vauban, a tower

Notes and references

External links 
Fortifications of the goulet de Brest

Landforms of Finistère
Fortifications of Brest, France
Straits of Metropolitan France